Ansley may refer to:

Places
Ansley, Warwickshire, in Warwickshire, England
Ansley, Louisiana
Ansley, Nebraska, in Nebraska, US
Ansley Park, in Georgia, US
Ansley Township, Custer County, Nebraska

Names
Ansley (given name)
Ansley (surname)